John Jordan (1910-1991) was an American basketball player and coach, best known for coaching the University of Notre Dame's men's basketball team from 1951 to 1964.

Jordan played basketball at Notre Dame in the 1930s and was a teammate of George Ireland, Moose Krause, and Ray Meyer. He was the captain of the Fighting Irish in 1935. After college, he took a coaching job at Mount Carmel High School in Chicago, and remained there until 1949. He spent the 1950–51 basketball season as coach at Loyola University Chicago, then took the reins at Notre Dame the following season. While at Notre Dame, Jordan recorded a 199-131 record and guided his players to five appearances in the NCAA tournament.

He attended Archbishop Quigley Preparatory Seminary in Chicago, graduating in 1929.

After Jordan's coaching career ended, he worked with the Chicago Park District. He died in Oak Forest, Illinois at the age of 81 in 1991.

Head coaching record

References

1991 deaths
American men's basketball coaches
American men's basketball players
Basketball coaches from Illinois
Basketball players from Chicago
Loyola Ramblers men's basketball coaches
Notre Dame Fighting Irish men's basketball coaches
Notre Dame Fighting Irish men's basketball players
Year of birth missing
People from Oak Forest, Illinois